Crossgates Commons is a large shopping plaza in Albany, New York along Washington Avenue Extension. It is owned and managed by Pyramid Management Group, Inc., who also own and manage the nearby Crossgates Mall.

History
Crossgates Commons is built within the Albany Pine Bush, one of the largest of the world's 20 inland pine barrens. When Europeans arrived in the early 17th century, the Pine Bush was in use as hunting grounds and firewood supply of the Mohawk nation of the Haudenosaunee to the west along the Mohawk River, and the Mahican to the east, along the Hudson River. One of the largest remaining remnants of the Pine Bush is located across Washington Avenue from the plaza, and is managed as the Pine Bush Preserve. 

When the shopping center first opened in 1994, it had six original tenants: Walmart (then branded as Wal-Mart), Sam's Club, Home Depot, Media Play, Old Navy, and MJ Designs.

The Walmart located at Crossgates Commons became the largest Walmart in the United States (and the largest outside of China) in 2008, when it expanded into a Walmart Supercenter, now occupying  over two floors.

Description
The shopping center has a split-level design with stores on the upper level accessible from the front and stores on the lower level accessible from the rear. It opened in 1994 and has  of retail space. Although Crossgates Commons is relatively young, it has already undergone an expansion, and some locations have had high turnover rates.

Tenants
(left to right)

Upper level

 The Home Depot
 At Home
 McDonald's (Outparcel) 
 Skechers Outlet
 T.J. Maxx (downsized early 2018, part now American Freight)
 American Freight
 Panera Bread (part of expansion project)
 Party City (part of expansion project)
 Walmart—2nd Floor (department store floor)

Lower level
 Walmart—1st Floor (supermarket floor).
 Mattress Xpress
PetSmart
 Albany Ninja Lab
Planet Fitness
Michaels

Former tenants
 Media Play (original tenant on upper level, 1994-1997) Later became HomePlace
 HomePlace (1997-1998) (upper level) Moved into former Media Play in 1997; later became Bob's Stores
 MJ Designs (original tenant on lower level, 1994-1999) Now Michaels
 The Big Party (1996-2000) (upper level) Now Party City
 Mars Music (2000-2003) (lower level) Now Mattress Xpress
 Kids "R" Us (1996-2004) (Moved from Northway Mall in 1996 to the upper level of Crossgates Commons) Part now Skechers Outlet
 Bob's Stores (1998-2004) (upper level) Later became Sports Authority. Location now occupied by part of At Home.
 Sam's Club (original tenant, 1994-May 1, 2006) closed in favor of the nearby Latham branch, and the location is now the supermarket/pharmacy level of Walmart Supercenter
 Giant Book Sale (2006) part now Skechers Outlet
 General Carpet Outlet (1998-2006) (lower level) Now Ollie's Bargain Outlet
 Tweeter (2001-2007) Closed in a wave of underperforming stores, now part of At Home
 Old Navy (1994-2008) Original tenant on upper level, and one of the first in the entire chain, closed in favor of existing branch at Crossgates Mall. Space now part of At Home.
 Circuit City (1999-2009) Part of expansion project on upper level. Closed on March 8, 2009, when the chain shuttered all of its American stores. Replaced by Ultimate Electronics. Now the site of T.J. Maxx and American Freight.
Jeepers! (1998-September 2010) Now Tuesday Morning
 Ultimate Electronics (June 2010-April 2011) Now occupied by T.J. Maxx and American Freight
Fastrax Raceway (2012-2014) - closed unexpectedly due to owners being evicted for nonpayment; replaced by K1 Speed, now T.J. Maxx and American Freight
Sears Outlet (original location; 2013–2018) relocated to portion of downsized T.J. Maxx, now Mattress Xpress
Sports Authority (2006-2016) Now part of At Home
K1 Speed (2015-2016) Replaced by TJ Maxx
Mattress Xpress (original location, 2015-2016) now part of At Home
Pump 'n Jump (2015-2016) Replaced by Tuesday Morning
 Golf Galaxy (2007–2018) part now Skechers Outlet
Noodles & Company (2017-2018) now Zaitoon Kitchen
Sears Outlet (second location; 2018–2020) now American Freight
Tuesday Morning (2016–2020) now vacant
Ollie's Bargain Outlet (2013–2021) now vacant
Zaitoon Kitchen (2019–2021) now vacant

Square footage
The Home Depot
Michael's
At Home
Walmart
T.J. Maxx

References

External links
Crossgates Commons (Pyramid Company web site)
Times Union article about Crossgates Commons' expansion
Crossgates Mall

The Pyramid Companies
Buildings and structures in Albany, New York
Guilderland, New York
Shopping malls in Albany County, New York
Tourist attractions in Albany, New York